Edwin Bateup (16 May 1881 – 29 April 1939) was an English footballer who played as a goalkeeper for Woolwich Arsenal, New Brompton, and Port Vale.

Career
Bateup played for Croydon Glenrose, the Dragoon Guards, Faversham, Woolwich Arsenal and New Brompton, before joining Port Vale from Arsenal in August 1911. He kept a clean sheet on his debut at the Athletic Ground, in a 1–0 win over Oldham Athletic Reserves in a Central League match on 4 September 1911. He remained the club's first choice keeper until September 1916, helping them to the Staffordshire Senior Cup, Birmingham Senior Cup and North Staffordshire Infirmary Cup on the way. After two years as a back-up keeper he retired from the game in 1918. He had kept goal for Vale on 193 occasions, including the first round of the FA Cup on 10 January 1914 against Bolton Wanderers.

Career statistics
Source:

Honours
Port Vale
Staffordshire Senior Cup: 1912
Birmingham Senior Cup: 1913
North Staffordshire Infirmary Cup: 1915

References

1881 births
1939 deaths
Footballers from Croydon
English footballers
Association football goalkeepers
Faversham Town F.C. players
Arsenal F.C. players
Gillingham F.C. players
Port Vale F.C. players
English Football League players